Hampshire County is the name of two counties in the United States:

 Hampshire County, Massachusetts
 Hampshire County, West Virginia

See also 
 Hampshire for the county in England
 Hampshire County Lunatic Asylum